Jean-Mickaël Raymond is a French amateur boxer. He qualified for the 2008 Olympics as a middleweight.

In addition to Georgios Gazis, Raymond defeated three unknowns. He was then stopped in the meaningless final by Darren Sutherland.

At the Olympics, Raymond lost his first bout 2:8 to Asian champion, Elshod Rasulov.

External links
2nd Qualifier

Living people
Olympic boxers of France
Middleweight boxers
Boxers at the 2008 Summer Olympics
French male boxers
Year of birth missing (living people)
Place of birth missing (living people)